The following species in the flowering plant genus Sida, the fanpetals or sidas, are accepted by Plants of the World Online. Sida has historically been a wastebasket taxon, including many plants that simply did not fit into other genera of the Malvaceae. Species have been continually reclassified.

Species

Sida abutifolia 
Sida acuta 
Sida adscendens 
Sida aggregata 
Sida alamosana 
Sida alba 
Sida albiflora 
Sida alii 
Sida ammophila 
Sida andersonii 
Sida angustifolia 
Sida angustissima 
Sida anodifolia 
Sida anomala 
Sida antillensis 
Sida aprica 
Sida arboae 
Sida arenicola 
Sida argentea 
Sida argentina 
Sida argillacea 
Sida arsiniata 
Sida asterocalyx 
Sida atherophora 
Sida aurantiaca 
Sida bakeriana 
Sida barclayi 
Sida beckii 
Sida bipartita 
Sida blepharoprion 
Sida boliviana 
Sida bordasiana 
Sida brachypoda 
Sida brachystemon 
Sida brittonii 
Sida brownii 
Sida cabraliana 
Sida cabreriana 
Sida calchaquiensis 
Sida calliantha 
Sida calva 
Sida calyxhymenia 
Sida cambuiensis 
Sida cardiophylla 
Sida carrascoana 
Sida castanocarpa 
Sida caudata 
Sida cavernicola 
Sida centuriata 
Sida cerradoensis 
Sida chapadensis 
Sida charpinii 
Sida chinensis 
Sida chiquitana 
Sida chrysantha 
Sida ciliaris 
Sida cleisocalyx 
Sida clementii 
Sida confusa 
Sida coradinii 
Sida cordata 
Sida cordifolia 
Sida cordifolioides 
Sida corrugata 
Sida coutinhoi 
Sida cristobaliana 
Sida cuneifolia 
Sida cuspidata 
Sida decandra 
Sida dubia 
Sida dureana 
Sida echinocarpa 
Sida ectogama 
Sida elliottii 
Sida elongata 
Sida emilei 
Sida esperanzae 
Sida everistiana 
Sida fallax 
Sida fastuosa 
Sida ferrucciana 
Sida fibulifera 
Sida floccosa 
Sida galheirensis 
Sida gertiana 
Sida glabra 
Sida glaziovii 
Sida glocimarii 
Sida glomerata 
Sida glutinosa 
Sida goniocarpa 
Sida goyazensis 
Sida gracilipes 
Sida gracillima 
Sida graniticola 
Sida grazielae 
Sida hackettiana 
Sida haenkeana 
Sida harleyi 
Sida hassleri 
Sida hatschbachii 
Sida hederifolia 
Sida hemitropousa 
Sida hibisciformis 
Sida hirsutissima 
Sida hoepfneri 
Sida honoriana 
Sida hookeriana 
Sida hyalina 
Sida hyssopifolia 
Sida intricata 
Sida itaparicana 
Sida jamaicensis 
Sida japiana 
Sida jatrophoides 
Sida javensis 
Sida jussiaeana 
Sida kingii 
Sida laciniata 
Sida lancifolia 
Sida leitaofilhoi 
Sida libenii 
Sida lilianae 
Sida limensis 
Sida lindheimeri 
Sida linearifolia 
Sida linearis 
Sida linifolia 
Sida littoralis 
Sida lonchitis 
Sida longipedicellata 
Sida longipes 
Sida luschnathiana 
Sida macaibae 
Sida macropetala 
Sida magnifica 
Sida marabaensis 
Sida martiana 
Sida massaica 
Sida meloana 
Sida meridiana 
Sida michoacana 
Sida monteiroi 
Sida monticola 
Sida multicrena 
Sida mysorensis 
Sida nemorensis 
Sida neomexicana 
Sida nesogena 
Sida nummularia 
Sida oblonga 
Sida ogadensis 
Sida oligandra 
Sida orientalis 
Sida ovalis 
Sida ovata 
Sida palmata 
Sida paradoxa 
Sida parva 
Sida paucifolia 
Sida pedersenii 
Sida pedunculata 
Sida pernambucensis 
Sida petrophila 
Sida petropolitana 
Sida phaeotricha 
Sida picklesiana 
Sida pindapoyensis 
Sida pires-blackii 
Sida planicaulis 
Sida platycalyx 
Sida pleiantha 
Sida poeppigiana 
Sida potentilloides 
Sida potosina 
Sida pradeepiana 
Sida pritzeliana 
Sida prolifica 
Sida pseudocordifolia 
Sida pseudocymbalaria 
Sida pseudopotentilloides 
Sida pseudorubifolia 
Sida pueblensis 
Sida pusilla 
Sida quettensis 
Sida quinquevalvacea 
Sida ravii 
Sida regnellii 
Sida reitzii 
Sida repens 
Sida rhizomatosa 
Sida rhombifolia 
Sida riedelii 
Sida rigida 
Sida rivulicola 
Sida rodrigoi 
Sida rohlenae 
Sida rubifolia 
Sida rubromarginata 
Sida rufescens 
Sida ruizii 
Sida rupicola 
Sida rzedowskii 
Sida salviifolia 
Sida samoensis 
Sida sampaiana 
Sida sangana 
Sida santaremensis 
Sida schimperiana 
Sida schininii 
Sida schumanniana 
Sida serrata 
Sida setosa 
Sida shinyangensis 
Sida simpsonii 
Sida sivarajanii 
Sida spenceriana 
Sida spinosa 
Sida subcordata 
Sida subcuneata 
Sida sucupirana 
Sida surumuensis 
Sida szechuensis 
Sida tanaensis 
Sida tenuicarpa 
Sida teresinensis 
Sida ternata 
Sida teysmannii 
Sida tiagii 
Sida tobatiensis 
Sida tragiifolia 
Sida tressensiae 
Sida trichopoda 
Sida tuberculata 
Sida turneroides 
Sida uchoae 
Sida ulei 
Sida ulmifolia 
Sida uniaristata 
Sida urens 
Sida vagans 
Sida vallsii 
Sida variegata 
Sida vespertina 
Sida viarum 
Sida waltoniana 
Sida weberbaueri 
Sida wingfieldii 
Sida xanti 
Sida yungasensis 
Sida yunnanensis 
Sida zahlbruckneri

References

Sida